USA Broomball is the former official governing body for the sport of broomball in the United States and was an organization recognized by the International Federation of Broomball Associations (IFBA). It folded prior to the 2020 season due to financial mismanagement. Two new American broomball organizations have since formed, All Elite Broomball (AEB) and the United States Broomball Association (USBA).

USA Broomball was responsible for sanctioning tournaments and leagues, training and certifying officials, and recognizing broomball governing bodies for individual states in the USA. It also organized and oversaw the annual National Championship tournament, held in Minnesota in odd-numbered years and in a different state with a recognized state organization in even-numbered years. National championships were contested in Men's Class A, Men's Class B, Men's Class C, Men's Class D, Co-Rec, and Collegiate divisions in 2007. USA Broomball took responsibility for placing teams in the appropriate division and teams were not allowed to pick up players from higher-division teams for the National Championships.

History

Until 2020, the American broomball organization that was recognized by the IFBA was USA Broomball. USA Broomball folded prior to the 2020 season due to financial mismanagement.  In its wake, two organizations were formed, All Elite Broomball (AEB) and the United States Broomball Association (USBA).

USA Broomball was responsible for sanctioning tournaments, training and certifying officials, and recognizing state governing bodies regarding broomball. The states that had governing bodies recognized by USA Broomball included Colorado, Iowa, Michigan, Minnesota, Nebraska, New York, North Dakota, and Ohio. USA Broomball also organized and oversaw the annual USA Broomball National Championships. In odd-numbered years, Minnesota (the unofficial U.S. broomball capital and home to the majority of broomball leagues and teams in the country) hosted  the National Championships. In even-numbered years, a different state with an officially recognized state organization hosted the tournament.

State organizations 
The states that had governing bodies recognized by USA Broomball included Colorado, Iowa, Michigan, Minnesota, Nebraska, New York, North Dakota, and Ohio.

The following states have currently recognized governing bodies:

National Championships sites 

1999: Bloomington, Minnesota
2000: Chaska, Minnesota
2001-2003: Rosemount, Minnesota
2004: Omaha, Nebraska
2005: Rosemount, Minnesota
2006: Lakewood, Ohio
2007: Blaine, Minnesota
2008: Fargo, North Dakota
2009: Richfield, Minnesota
2010: Blaine, Minnesota
2011: Duluth, Minnesota
2012: Blaine, Minnesota
2013: Oxford, Ohio
2014: Blaine, Minnesota
2015: Fargo, North Dakota
2016: Minneapolis, Richfield, Minnesota
2017: Delmont, Pennsylvania
2018: Blaine, Minnesota
2019: Fargo, North Dakota
2020 Nationals was to be held at New Hope, Minnesota, but was cancelled due to the COVID-19 pandemic.

2016 National Championship results 
Men's Class A: Champions - Barrie's Tavern
                             Runners-up - Nomadic Horde
Men's Class B: Champions - Watkins Legion
                             Runners-up - Minnesota Bombers
Men's Class C: Champions - OG's
                             Runners-up - Dayton Bombers
Men's Class D: Champions - Champion Awards
                             Runners-up - University of Nebraska
Men's Collegiate: Champions - Miami University
Women's Class A: Champions - Arctic Blast
                             Runners-up - Tracy's
Women's Class B: Champions - Broomstormers
                             Runners-up - Flying V's
Co-Rec A: Champions - Revels Repair
                             Runners-up - Old Town Tavern
Co-Rec B: Champions - Bi-Partisans
                             Runners-up - Kutters

See also
 Broomball
 List of broomball teams
 Broomball Canada
 Broomball Australia
 International Federation of Broomball Associations

References

External links 
 All Elite Broomball (AEB)
 United States Broomball Association (USBA)
 Cincinnati Broomball Association (CBA)
 Boston Broomball Inc.
 Midwest Broomball - Broomball Equipment Store
  [website dead]

Broomball